Dade2 in a privately held web hosting company with offices in both the United Kingdom and Italy. Launched in 2009, the company is a Microsoft specialist provider offering Windows dedicated servers, cloud solution and Microsoft Exchange email hosting. The company uses its own datacenter facilities located in Iceland with more than 10,000 servers. They rely exclusively on green energy coming from geothermic activity to power their Tier II+ certified data center and offer services in the UK, Ireland, Italy, Spain, Hungary, and portions of the middle east. They are one of the few companies in the world that rely solely on green energy to power their facilities.

References

Companies based in the London Borough of Camden
Internet properties established in 2009